Irene Tordoff Fritchie, Baroness Fritchie, DBE (née Fennell; born 29 April 1942 in Fife, Scotland), known as Rennie Fritchie, is a British crossbench peer.

Life/career
Irene Tordoff Fennell, daughter of Mr and Mrs Charles Frederick Fennell, was educated at Ribston Hall Grammar School for Girls in Gloucester and has had a long career specialising in training and development. Now described as a "portfolio" worker, she has held various positions including Commissioner for Public Appointments from 1999 to 2005, and President of the Pennell Initiative for Women's Health in Later Life.

In the 1970s, she was one of the first full-time women's training advisers and pioneered the training of staff in the then new Equal Opportunities Commission. Using a German Marshall Fellowship awarded in 1985, she drew lessons from the United States of America for the United Kingdom for programmes to improve the status of women. She has published extensively on these topics and contributes regularly on them to programmes on television and radio. She became Chairman of Nominet in 2010.

Affiliations
She holds a number of positions outside government. She holds an honorary Professorship in Creative Leadership at York University and is Pro-Chancellor at Southampton University, a Civil Service Commissioner and Vice-Chair of the Stroud and Swindon Building Society. Active in a number of charities, Fritchie has been awarded honorary degrees by a number of academic institutions. Fritchie is Chair of the 2gether NHS Foundation Trust in Gloucestershire, and in 2012 was appointed as the new chancellor of the University of Gloucestershire.

Family
In 1960 she married Don Jamie Fritchie with whom she had two children, the elder dying in 1991. She was widowed in 1992.

Honours
Fritchie became a Dame Commander of the Order of the British Empire in the 1996 New Year Honours. On 31 May 2005 she was made a life peer as Baroness Fritchie, of Gloucester in the County of Gloucestershire, and she sits as a crossbencher in the House of Lords.

Arms

References

1942 births
Living people
Dames Commander of the Order of the British Empire
Life peeresses created by Elizabeth II
People from Fife
People's peers
Academics of the University of Southampton
People associated with the University of Gloucestershire
Crossbench life peers
Commissioners for Public Appointments